1954 Rugby League World Cup group stage was the main component of the 1954 Rugby League World Cup, with the top two nations qualifying for the final. The group comprised Australia, New Zealand, Great Britain and France.

Ladder

France vs New Zealand
France's niggling tactics in their win against New Zealand in the tournament's opening match drew criticism from the media and the Kiwis coach, Jim Amos. New Zealand winger Jimmy Edwards had the distinction of being the first scorer in World Cup history with a try after only five minutes. Puig-Aubert landed the first goal.

Australia vs Great Britain
The British team proved too strong for Australia in both sides' first World Cup game.

Australia vs New Zealand
Australia's victory in this match put them in third position on the ladder and New Zealand last.

France vs Great Britain
The game gripped the attention of the rugby league public as never before with a record crowd of 37,471 attending at Toulouse. That record crowd has still not been beaten in France. The draw resulted in Great Britain and France sharing the lead in the tournament.

France vs Australia
Australia and France were playing for the chance to meet Great Britain in the final. Mistakes cost the Australians the match, so France advanced to the decider.

Great Britain vs New Zealand

References

1954 Rugby League World Cup